Hans Peter Doskozil (born 21 June 1970) is an Austrian politician, member of the Social Democratic Party of Austria (SPÖ). He has previously served in cabinet and is currently the governor of Burgenland since 28 February 2019. In the 2020 Burgenland election, he led his party to win a majority of the seats in Burgenland's parliament.

Education
Doskozil studied law at the University of Vienna from 1994 until 2000 (Mag. iur.).

Political career
On migrant policy, as governor, Doskozil has at times adopted a harder line than his predecessor Gerald Klug. In 2016, he successfully introduced new asylum measures, including a process under which migrants could be turned away at the border within an hour, which could be activated if lawmakers decree public order is threatened.

Also during his time in office, Austria sued Airbus and the Eurofighter consortium in 2017, alleging wilful deception and fraud linked to a near 2 billion euro ($2.1 billion) jet order in 2003.

In a November 2022 poll, the SPÖ received a plurality of the votes when respondents were asked which party they would vote for under the condition that Doskozil would run as the SPÖ's candidate for chancellor of Austria.

References

1970 births
Austrian Ministers of Defence
Living people
People from Styria
Social Democratic Party of Austria politicians
University of Vienna alumni
21st-century Austrian politicians
Austrian people of Czech descent